William Richards Bennett,  (April 14, 1932 – December 3, 2015) was the 27th premier of British Columbia from 1975 to 1986. He was a son of Annie Elizabeth May (Richards) and former Premier, W. A. C. Bennett. He was a 3rd cousin, twice removed, of R.B. Bennett, eleventh Prime Minister of Canada.

Following his father's resignation, Bill Bennett was elected on September 7, 1973, as the British Columbia Social Credit League Member of the British Columbia Legislative Assembly for South Okanagan.

His father was also named William, but was usually called "W.A.C." in the media or "Cece" by his friends. To distinguish the son from his father, he was usually called "Bill." The nickname was created by his opponents, but also embraced by some supporters.

Leader of Social Credit Party
Bennett was elected the leader of the Socred Party in November 1973, at a convention in Whistler, British Columbia. This convention also changed the name of the party to the British Columbia Social Credit Party. Bennett set about establishing a political organization modelled closely on and using staff lent by Bill Davis's Ontario "Big Blue Machine." Bennett's organization was called the "Baby Blue Machine." He embraced a new coalition of Liberals, social conservatives, and the corporate sector, unlike his father, who had appealed to the populist base.

Premier of British Columbia

He became premier of the province in the 1975 election when his party defeated the New Democratic Party of Premier David Barrett. In the election of May 10, 1979, the Social Credit Party was re-elected with a reduced majority, followed by another one in the 1983 election. He served until August 6, 1986.

In 1978, Bennett was instrumental in establishing the BC Winter Games and BC Summer Games. As a result, an award was named in his honour in which he presented the award in 2008 in his hometown, Kelowna, where the BC Summer Games were being hosted that year.

His cabinet included politicians new to the provincial scene who would soon become some of BC's most prominent political players. They included Pat McGeer, Grace McCarthy, Bill Vander Zalm, Garde Gardom, Rafe Mair, and Jim Nielsen. Inspired by conservative economist Milton Friedman, his government passed a series of laws, known as the "Restraint" program, which slashed social services and gutted labour laws in response to economic woes in 1983, provoking a general strike, which further crippled the economy. To justify massive education cuts, Bennett blamed many of the province's difficulties on public school teachers, an argument that deeply split the electorate. In several television interviews, he labeled those who disagreed with his policies as "bad British Columbians."

On the other hand, his ostensibly-antisocialist government spent hundreds of millions of dollars to bring Expo 86 to Vancouver and related projects including BC Place, the city's SkyTrain rapid transit system, and the Vancouver Trade and Convention Centre. His government also built the Coquihalla Highway at a cost of hundreds of millions of dollars with non-union Kerkhoff Construction Company as the main contractor. It distributed free shares to British Columbians for the British Columbia Resources Investment Corporation (BCRIC). His government also spent over $1 billion on the Northeast coal project to create jobs. Critics noted that by creating only 1,000 jobs, each job cost taxpayers $1 million.

Controversies
In 1996, Bill Bennett was convicted under BC securities laws of insider trading involving the sale of shares in Doman Securities, a Duncan, BC company, ten years after he stepped down as premier. That was known as the Doman Scandal. A British Columbia Securities Commission panel imposed trading sanctions against Russell James Bennett and Harbanse Singh Doman and ordered them along with Bill Bennett to pay the commission $1 million to cover the costs of an insider trading case that spanned 11 years.

British Columbia Resources Investment Corporation (BCRIC or "Brick") (Social Credit Party), a holding company formed under the government of William R. Bennett, was a public boondoggle involving publicly l-distributed and soon-worthless shares of a former Crown Corporation. Shares briefly rallied and then dropped and settled at less than one dollar.

Bennett's tenure also included megaprojects such as the Coquihalla Highway, which cost approximately $848 million.

Retirement
Though still reviled by the left, Bennett remains generally highly respected among conservatives in BC, who view his rule as a "golden era" before compared to the governments of Social Credit premier Bill Vander Zalm and the New Democratic Party premiers who succeeded him. In his later years Bennett advised past BC Premier Gordon Campbell, who openly stated his desire to emulate the policies associated with Bennett's government. 

In 2007 Bennett was appointed to the Order of British Columbia, B.C.'s highest award for achievement. The new replacement bridge across Okanagan Lake in Kelowna is named after him.

Illness and death
Bennett was diagnosed with Alzheimer's disease around 2007 and in his later years, lived in a long-term care facility. He died on December 3, 2015 at the age of 83.

References

1932 births
2015 deaths
20th-century Canadian legislators
British Columbia Social Credit Party leaders
British Columbia Social Credit Party MLAs
Deaths from Alzheimer's disease
Members of the Executive Council of British Columbia
Members of the Order of British Columbia
Members of the King's Privy Council for Canada
Members of the United Church of Canada
Neurological disease deaths in British Columbia
People from Kelowna
People of New England Planter descent
Premiers of British Columbia